The 2018 NAIA Division I men's basketball tournament was held in March at Municipal Auditorium in Kansas City, Missouri. The 81st annual NAIA basketball tournament features 32 teams playing in a single-elimination format. The opening game round started on March 14, and the National Championship Game was played on March 20. As of 2018, 576 schools have participated in the NAIA Men's Tournament. 48 states, all but Alaska and Wyoming have been represented.

The Tournament Final saw the Graceland Yellowjackets beat the Generals of LSU–Alexandria 83 to 80 in overtime, with the winning 3-point basket made from the right sideline as the game clock expired. It was the first overtime final since 2016, and the ninth overtime final in tournament history. This was Graceland University’s first appearance in the national tournament, and first championship. LSU Alexandria also marked its first appearance in the tournament. The most recent previous first appearance champion was Dalton State (Ga.) in 2015. Graceland became the first team with double-digit losses to win the title since John Brown (Ark.) in 2005. Graceland was the first team from the Heart of America Athletic Conference to compete in the championship final.

Including the 2018 championship, the last 11 national champions have been different, with Texas Wesleyan taking the 2017 trophy. Six of those champions in the last nine years – Mid-America Christian, Dalton State (Ga.), Vanguard (Calif.), Pikeville (Ky.), Rocky Mountain (Mont.) and Graceland – were winners for the first time in school history.

Awards and honors
Player of the Year: Ryan Imhoff Carroll (Mont.) 
Most consecutive tournament appearances: 27th, Georgetown (KY)
Most tournament appearances: 37th, Georgetown (KY)
Dr. James Naismith: Emil S. Liston 
Team Sportsmanship Award: Montana State-Northern
Chuck Walden Memorial Award: Scott Thompson and Julia Robinson, Tricension
NABC-NAIA Coach of the Year: Kelvin Starr, The Master's (Calif.)

2018 NAIA bracket

denotes overtime.

See also
2018 NAIA Division I women's basketball tournament
2018 NCAA Division I men's basketball tournament
2018 NCAA Division II men's basketball tournament
2018 NCAA Division III men's basketball tournament
2018 NAIA Division II men's basketball tournament

References

NAIA Men's Basketball Championship
Tournament
NAIA Division I men's basketball tournament
NAIA Division I men's basketball tournament